Teen Turn is an Irish charity which encourages teenage girls to pursue careers in technology.

History
Teen Turn is an Irish charity which was founded in 2016 by Joanne Dolan and Niambh Scullion with the aim of promoting technology and computer skills to girls in disadvantaged areas. It was first trialed in the summer of 2016 with 20 girls from five schools, and since has expanded to 18 schools and 30 tech companies.

Activities
In particular the group aim to work with girls from communities with low uptake of university or third level education. They partner with technology and digital companies to provide work placements and mentoring. They provide two week work placements. The charity also run after school programs. Participants from this program in Limerick went on to win the BT Young Pioneer Award in 2018. In 2018, Teen Turn partnered with The Digital Hub and Gaisce to take part in the Technovation Challenge.

Awards 

 2017 EU Digital Impact Organisation of the Year.

References

External links
Official Twitter account

Women in technology
Computer science education
Diversity in computing
Women and science
Organizations for women in science and technology
Digital divide